The 2015 Currie Cup Premier Division was the 77th season in the competition since it started in 1889 and was contested from 7 August to 24 October 2015. The tournament (known as the Absa Currie Cup Premier Division for sponsorship reasons) was the top tier of South Africa's premier domestic rugby union competition.

Competition rules and information

There were eight participating teams in the 2015 Currie Cup Premier Division.

Qualification

, who finished 7th in 2014, as well as the six teams in the 2014 Currie Cup First Division, took part in a qualification tournament to determine the final participant.

The qualification competition was won by Griquas for the second year in succession.

Regular season and title playoffs

The eight teams were divided into two sections, based on their 2014 positions. Teams in each section played each other twice over the course of the season, once at home and once away. Teams also played cross-section matches, playing one match (either home or away) against the teams in the other section.

Teams received four points for a win and two points for a draw. Bonus points were awarded to teams that scored 4 or more tries in a game, as well as to teams that lost a match by 7 points or less. Teams were ranked by points, then points difference (points scored less points conceded).

The top 4 teams qualified for the title play-offs. In the semifinals, the team that finished first had home advantage against the team that finish fourth, while the team that finished second had home advantage against the team that finished third. The winners of these semi-finals played each other in the final, at the home venue of the higher-placed team.

Teams

Team Listing

Log
The final log of the round-robin stage of the 2015 Currie Cup Premier Division was:

Round-by-round

The table below shows each team's progression throughout the season. For each round, their cumulative points total is shown with the overall log position in brackets:

Fixtures and results

The following matches were played for the 2015 Currie Cup Premier Division:

Round one

Defending champions  began their defence of the title with a 43–19 win over qualifier  in Kimberley. They ran in six tries, with South Africa Sevens international Seabelo Senatla getting two tries, while Demetri Catrakilis scored 13 points for the winning side. Golden Lions loose-forward Kwagga Smith scored a hat-trick of tries to help secure a four-try bonus points as early as the 16th minute of the match, while fly-half Marnitz Boshoff contributed 21 points, by successfully converting all nine kicks at goal during the match. The biggest win of the weekend came in Bloemfontein, where the  ran in six tries to beat the  57–19. Blue Bulls fly-half Tian Schoeman topped the scoring charts after Round One, kicking five conversions and four penalties for a total of 22 points in the match, while scrum-half Francois Hougaard scored two tries for the Blue Bulls to send them top of the log.

Round two

Fly-half Tian Schoeman kicked 16 points for the Blue Bulls and also scored one of the Blue Bulls' tries. The Golden Lions scored five tries – two of those penalty tries – to the ' three to prevail 44–27 in Johannesburg in a clash between two previously unbeaten sides that saw three players sent to the sin-bin. All eight tries in the match were successfully converted by the Golden Lions' Marnitz Boshoff (who also scored two penalties and a drop goal for a personal tally of 19 points) and the Pumas' JC Roos. There were no tries in the match in Cape Town as  won their second match in succession by edging the clash 9–3 against a  side who had three players sin-binned, a result that saw the latter lose their second consecutive match, but gain a losing bonus point. The  and the  each scored four tries in their clash in Durban, which saw the hosts get their first win of the season to move into fourth position on the log while the EP Kings' bonus points kept them in seventh, one point clear of Griquas.

Round three

Despite scoring the only try of the match, the  lost the first match of the weekend 13–15 to a  side for whom fly-half JC Roos slotted five penalties in five attempts. In a battle between two teams without any victories in the competition this far, the  ran out winners by beating  31–9 in Kimberley. The Cheetahs secured a bonus point by scoring four tries, with Fred Zeilinga scoring one of those in a personal contribution of 16 points, while Griquas remain bottom of the log with no log points to their name. The two teams from Gauteng remained the only unbeaten teams after victories in their matches – the  scored four tries to beat the  31–16 in Durban, while the  beat defending champions  47–29 in the highest-scoring match of the weekend, with Jamba Ulengo scoring two tries and fly-half Tian Schoeman contributing 19 points with the boot, the same points haul as Western Province's Demetri Catrakilis.

Round four

Kwagga Smith scored two tries and Marnitz Boshoff contributed 21 points with the boot as the Golden Lions scored a convincing 41–11 victory over a Pumas side that saw four of their players sin-binned during the course of the match. Fly-half Tian Schoeman kicked 16 points to maintain his spot at the top of the points scoring charts, while winger Jamba Ulengo scored two tries in the match to top the try scoring charts. Dries Swanepoel also scored two tries as the visitors outscored Griquas by six tries to four. The  secured their second consecutive win by beating  28–21 in a match in Bloemfontein to move into the semifinal spots for the first time this season. Western Province remain in third despite suffering their second consecutive defeat.

Round Five

The  preserved their unbeaten status, winning their fifth consecutive match of the competition by beating the  37–21 in Johannesburg. They scored five tries – which included their fourth penalty try of the season – against the visitors' three, which included a brace from loose-forward Paul Schoeman. Both teams scored two tries, with the kicking by competition top-scorer Tian Schoeman and replacement Louis Fouché proving decisive for the Blue Bulls. Winger Wandile Mjekevu contributed two tries for the Sharks and full-back Joe Pietersen contributed 12 points with the boot against a Pumas side that remained in sixth position. In Cape Town,  returned to winning ways after two consecutive defeats by beating  33–15. They also got a bonus point for scoring four tries in the match through four different try scorers, while the highest points contribution of the round came from Clinton Swart, who kicked five penalties for a  team who remain bottom of the log with a single point to their name.

Round Six

The  beat their trans-Jukskei rivals the  36–28 in the top-of-the-table match between two previously unbeaten teams. The Blue Bulls outscored the Golden Lions by four tries to three (with Blue Bulls winger Jamba Ulengo getting two tries), but it was not enough as 21 points from the boot of Marnitz Boshoff decided the match in the favour of the team from Johannesburg. This allowed  to close the gap to the Blue Bulls after they beat the  37–27 in Durban and securing a bonus point for their four tries. The Eastern Province Kings beat the  32–24 in Port Elizabeth despite playing the majority of the second half with just fourteen players following JP du Plessis' sending off for a punch. The Free State Cheetahs scored four tries, but Scott van Breda kicked 22 points to secure the victory for the home side. Despite scoring four tries in the match, the result left Griquas bottom of the log, one point behind the Eastern Province Kings.

Round Seven

The  beat the  26–18 in their clash in Johannesburg to extend their unbeaten run to seven matches and also ensuring a semi-final slot. Both sides scored two tries as 16 points from the boot of Marnitz Boshoff proved decisive for the home side. The  got the biggest win of the weekend, beating their Super Rugby franchise partners  44–24 in Bloemfontein.

Round Eight

The  won their eighth consecutive match in the competition, scoring ten tries as they beat the  73–31 in Bloemfontein. Courtnall Skosan and Jaco Kriel scored two tries each and fly-half Marnitz Boshoff had a faultless kicking performance, converting all ten tries after opening the scoring with his only penalty attempt of the match. A hat-trick by Cheetahs flanker Vince Jobo helped his side get a four-try bonus point to remain in fourth spot on the log, in the final semi-final position. The  remained in second spot on the log as they beat the  17–13 in Durban, but  drew level on points with the Blue Bulls as both sides secured a semi-final berth. Western Province beat the  50–19 in Cape Town, with fly-half Robert du Preez scoring two tries and contributing a further 11 points with the boot for Western Province, while the Pumas' Roscko Speckman also scored a brace for his side. EP Kings flanker Paul Schoeman also got two tries in the match, as did Griquas winger Danie Dames.

Round Nine

The  secured top spot on the log (and home advantage in their semi-final match) after a 62–32 victory over third-placed . The Golden Lions scored nine tries from nine different try scorers in their victory, while Western Province secured a bonus point for scoring four tries, with Sikhumbuzo Notshe scoring two of those. The  overturned a 17–20 half time deficit to win their match against the  48–27. Francois Hougaard and Lappies Labuschagné each scored two of the Blue Bulls' seven tries as they consolidated second spot on the log.

Round Ten

The Free State Cheetahs led 17–13 at half-time, but the Sharks fought back and had a 34–20 lead by the 75th minute. However, the Free State Cheetahs responded with two late tries of their own, both of which were converted by Niel Marais – the second of those after the final hooter went – to earn themselves a 34-all draw, which was enough to see them remain in fourth spot on the log, with the Sharks remaining in fifth. The  – already assured of top spot on the log – beat the bottom side  29–19 in Johannesburg to complete the regular season with 10 wins out of 10. Jacques Nel scored two tries for the home side as the result guaranteed Griquas would finish bottom.

Semi-finals

Defending champions  ensured they would play in their fourth consecutive Currie Cup final by beating the  23–18 in Pretoria. There were no tries scored in the first half, with the Blue Bulls' Tian Schoeman and Western Province's Robert du Preez each kicking three penalties as the teams went into the half-time break at 9-all. Schoeman scored a further three penalties in the second half, but tries from Cheslin Kolbe and Jano Vermaak for the visitors – both converted by Du Preez – secured a spot in the final for the team from Cape Town. The other semi-final was a high-scoring affair, with the  beating the  43–33 in Johannesburg. Golden Lions captain Jaco Kriel scored two tries, lock Lourens Erasmus scored one and a 65th minute penalty try completed the Golden Lions' try-scoring, while fly-half Marnitz Boshoff successfully converted the four tries and also kicked all five of his penalty attempts to finish the match with a personal points tally of 23 points. The  actually scored one try more than the Golden Lions with Francois Venter, Boom Prinsloo, Gerhard Olivier, Niel Marais and Sias Ebersohn each getting a try, but kicked just 11 points through Marais as the visitors fell just short. The result set up a repeat of the 2014 Currie Cup final between Western Province and Golden Lions, this time to be played at the latter's home ground in Johannesburg.

Final

The  secured their eleventh Currie Cup title by beating  32–24 in Johannesburg. They scored two tries in the first quarter of the match through Warren Whiteley and Ross Cronjé – both converted by Marnitz Boshoff to lead 14–0. A Robert du Preez penalty put Western Province on the scoreboard in the 27th minute, but the Golden Lions responded minutes later when Ross Cronjé scored his second try of the match to lead 22–3. Western Province scored a try of their own at the end of the first half, with Robert du Preez scoring and converting the try for a half-time score of 22–10 to the hosts. Just two minutes after the restart, a further try Golden Lions centre Rohan Janse van Rensburg, again converted by Boshoff, stretched their lead to 29–10. Western Province reduced the deficit to eight points by the 63rd minute after scoring tries through Nizaam Carr and Sikhumbuzo Notshe – converted by Du Preez and Kurt Coleman respectively – on either side of a Boshoff penalty for the Golden Lions, but neither team could get on the scoreboard after that and the Golden Lions won the match 32–24 to go through the entire season unbeaten to win their first title since 2011.

Honours

The honour roll for the 2015 Currie Cup Premier Division was:

Players

Points scorers

The following table contain points which were scored in the 2015 Currie Cup Premier Division:

Appearances

The player appearance record in the 2015 Currie Cup Premier Division is as follows:

For each team, (c) denotes the team captain. For each match, the player's squad number is shown. Starting players are numbered 1 to 15, while the replacements are numbered 16 to 22. "App" refers to the number of appearances made by the player, "Try" to the number of tries scored by the player, "Kck" to the number of points scored via kicks (conversions, penalties or drop goals) and "Pts" refer to the total number of points scored by the player.

Discipline

The following table contains all the cards handed out during the tournament:

Referees

The following referees officiated matches in the 2015 Currie Cup Premier Division:

 Stuart Berry
 Rodney Boneparte
 Quinton Immelman
 AJ Jacobs
 Cwengile Jadezweni
 Craig Joubert
 Pro Legoete
 Jaco Peyper
 Rasta Rasivhenge
 Marius van der Westhuizen
 Jaco van Heerden

See also

 2015 Currie Cup qualification
 2015 Currie Cup First Division
 2015 Vodacom Cup
 2015 Under-21 Provincial Championship Group A
 2015 Under-21 Provincial Championship Group B
 2015 Under-19 Provincial Championship Group A
 2015 Under-19 Provincial Championship Group B

References

 
2015
2015 in South African rugby union
2015 rugby union tournaments for clubs